The Rolls-Royce 20/25 was the second of Rolls-Royce Ltd's pre-war entry level models.  Built between 1929 and 1936, it was tremendously popular, becoming the most successful selling inter-war Rolls-Royce.  Its success enabled Rolls-Royce to survive the economic difficulties of the Great Depression years and remain one of world's great brands.  A total of 3,827 20/25s were produced, of which over 70% are still on the road today.

Origin
The 20/25 was the successor of the highly successful 20 hp Rolls-Royce Twenty  introduced in 1922.  The target market for the 20/25 was the same as the Twenty – the luxury, owner driver market.  The project to develop the next generation 20 hp was code named Goshawk.  The goal for the new model was to increase power & performance.   This was achieved by increasing the bore size from 3 to 3.25 inches. The stroke was unchanged at 4.5 inches.  This resulted in a 17% increase in capacity from 3128 to 3675cc – bring the RAC rating up to 25.4 hp.

The new 20/25 model was debuted at the 1929 Olympia Motor Show and proved to be tremendously popular becoming the greatest of the inter-war successes.  There were 3827 20/25 hp produced – over twice the number of its contemporary sibling the Phantom II. The popularity of the 20/25 saved Rolls-Royce Limited during the pre-war economically difficult years.  Ultimately 20/25 model was replaced by the 25/30 model in 1936 in which the bore was further increased to 3.5 inches.  In 1938 the 25/30 was given a new chassis with independent front suspension and was renamed the Wraith.

The 20/25 also enabled Rolls-Royce Ltd to quickly capitalize on its 1931 acquisition of Bentley Motors Ltd.  As part of integrating its acquisition, Rolls-Royce management discontinued the Bentley 8-Litre car due to the perceived market overlap with the Phantom II.  This meant the acquisition brought with it the Bentley brand, debt and engineers & manufacturing employees with no product to produce.  They quickly decided to create a new Bentley using the 20/25 engine with some adaptations and a chassis developed for a 2 ¾ litre Rolls-Royce that was to be an economy version of the 20/25 but had been cancelled.  This formed the basis of the first Derby Bentley – the 3 ½ litre Bentley.  The "Silent Sports Car" as they become known were highly successful and were another major contribution of the 20/25 to the success of Rolls-Royce Ltd.

Engineering
The general Technical Specification of the 20/25 are:

Engine: In-line 6-cylinder, overhead pushrod operated valve engine with 3699cc capacity. Separate cast iron block and aluminum crankcase with detachable cast iron 6-plug head. It has an 82 mm bore with a 114 mm stroke.  7-bearing crankshaft with vibration damper. Pressure fed lubrication with relief valve feeding rocker shaft and timing gears.

Ignition System: Independent coil and standby magneto systems. 12V system 50 Amp/Hrs battery. Centrifugal advance with hand override. Distributor gap 0.017-0.021inches

Cooling System: The famous Rolls-Royce radiator with triangular top with vertical louvres, the angle of which can be adjusted to control engine cooling. To begin with, the radiator shutters were operated manually via a lever on the dash; after 1931 cars were fitted with automatic control via a thermostat.  Engine driven centrifugal pump and belt-driven fan.

Carburation: A single Rolls-Royce 2-jet type with starting carburetor, automatic air valve and steering column control.

Fuel: 14 gallon rear tank increased to 18 gallon tank starting in 1932.  Autovac (vacuum fed) fuel pump and an electric fuel gauge (starting in 1933).

Transmission: 4-speed gearbox, synchromesh in 3rd and top from 1932. Right hand gearchange. Single dry plate clutch. Open drive propeller shaft.

Suspension: Semi-elliptic leaf springs front and rear. Hydraulic dampers.

Brakes: Internal expanding 4 wheel operation with independent handbrake on the rear wheels. Mechanical servo motor driven from the gearbox.

Chassis lubrication: "One-Shot" Bijur centralized chassis lubrication system.

Steering: Worm and nut. (1936, Marles cam and roller - GTK 42)

Improvements made during production run

Rolls-Royce continued to enhance the 20/25 engineering over its production run, it had 36 technical releases or series.  The key enhancements by year are:

1930:

 Flexible engine suspension.
 5.25:1 compression ratio
 Longer Wheelbase (11’ 0")

1931
 Reserve Petrol Supply
 Anti-splash radiator cap

1932
 Completely centralized chassis lubrication system
 Diamond engine mounting
 New thin-rimmed steering wheel
 Improved engine performance, 5.75:1 compression ratio
 High-lift camshaft
 Double-acting hydraulic shock dampers
 Larger radiator (4" deeper)
 ‘Staybrite’ Radiator shell
 Thermostatically-controlled shutters
 Low-inertia spring-drive crankshaft vibration damper
 Two-rate charging system
 Electric fuel gauge
 Synchromesh on third and top gears

1933
 Nitralloy crankshaft
 Three-rate charging system
 Silent second gear

1934
 Single-jet expanding carburetor
 Air silencer
 Needle-bearing propeller shaft
 Ride Control
 DWS permanent jacks

1935
 Flexible engine mounting
 Voltage-controlled generator

1936
 Borg & Beck clutch
 Hypoid rear axle
 Marles cam & roller steering

Performance
Based on an Autocar Test, June 1935 on a Hooper closed-coupled Sports Saloon:

Acceleration
 From rest to 50 mph through gears in 21.0 sec
 From rest to 60 mph through gears in 31.4 sec

Best timed speed: 76.27 mph

Maximum Speeds in gears:
 1st – 18 mph
 2nd – 32 mph
 3rd – 53 mph
 4th – 76 mph

Petrol Consumption: Driven Hard – 14 mpg

The 20/25 engine and chassis were designed for the owner driver market – ideally fitted with a smaller sedan or coupe body as the one used in the 1935 Autocar Test.  Unfortunately many 20/25's were fitted with larger and heavier limousine bodies which hurt their performance.

Bodywork
Only the chassis and mechanical parts were made by Rolls-Royce. The body was made and fitted by a coachbuilder selected by the owner. Amongst the most respected coachbuilders who produced bodies for Rolls-Royce cars are Park Ward, Thrupp & Maberly, Mulliner, Carlton and Hooper.

Today
Today 20/25s are immensely popular with PMC enthusiasts. This was the car that saved Rolls-Royce during the great depression.  They are a great value as they are significantly less expensive than the pre-war large horsepower Rolls-Royces and WO Bentleys and are solid drivers on today's roads. The price of a 20/25 is typically 1/2 to 1/5 the price of its larger horsepower contemporary, the Phantom II, and it is much more drivable than its predecessor the 20 hp.  This makes them an ideal pre-war PMC for the owner who wants to enjoy weekend drives and car club outings.

Maintenance – Pre-war Rolls-Royces were exceptionally well designed. There were 3,827 20/25s produced and over 70% are still on the road today.   The 20/25 are relatively easy to maintain for someone with general automotive experience. Basic parts are still readily available through specialty shops such as Fiennes Restoration Ltd in the UK. In Europe, the US and Australia there are a network of restoration and repair shops that are experienced in pre-war Rolls-Royce and Bentley cars (although the number of quality shops continues to decline as a generation of excellent mechanics retire.)  For many, part of the joy of owning a 20/25 is maintaining these magnificent cars.  The Rolls-Royce car clubs sponsor popular on-line forums and regular in-person meetings for members to help each other on all type of repairs and restorations.  There is always a member ready to help a fellow enthusiast by sharing his/her experience.

Driving – The 20/25 is a joy to drive.  The steering is quite high geared so little turning of the wheel is required and it is accurate enabling the car to be placed exactly where the driver wants.  On country road cruising at 40 to 50 mph all but the heaviest bodied cars are happy. Many owners have added an overdrive to their 20/25 which enables a car to cruise at Highway speeds of 50 to 65 mph.

Geographic Location – Originally 93% of 20/25 were sold within the UK but due to their global popularity as a drivable, eloquent pre-war motor car they have migrated across the globe.  Today only 38% of the remaining cars are still in the UK, 20/25s now reside in over 50 countries.

Film appearances

The Rolls-Royce 20/25 hp is featured in films such as;  The League of Gentlemen (1959), Father Came Too! (1963), The Brides of Fu Manchu (1966), To Be or Not To Be (1983), and Indiana Jones and the Last Crusade (1989) (misidentified as a Phantom II).

A 1934 Mulliner-bodied car, chassis number (grc33), registration BMG443 was used many times by the BBC and some Hollywood and British based movie makers; its credits include:

'To The Manor Born' - where it was used as Audrey's much loved Rolls through the whole series.

Dad's Army - episode The Captain's Car, where the platoon stole it by accident from the mayor and camouflaged it.

Secret Ceremony - A 1968 British drama horror film from Universal Pictures starring Elizabeth Taylor, Mia Farrow & Robert Mitchum

Au Pair Girls - A 1972 British sex comedy film starring John Le Mesurier, Richard O'Sullivan, Trevor Bannister, and Harold Bennet,

Gallery

References

20 25
1930s cars